Islamic extremism, Islamist extremism, or radical Islam, is used in reference to extremist beliefs and behaviors which are associated with the Islamic religion. These are controversial terms with varying definitions, ranging from academic understandings to the idea that all ideologies other than Islam have failed and are inferior to Islam. These terms can also be used in reference to other sects of Islam that do not share such beliefs. Political definitions of Islamic extremism include the one which is used by the government of the United Kingdom, which understands Islamic extremism as any form of Islam that opposes "democracy, the rule of law, individual liberty and mutual respect and tolerance of different faiths and beliefs". In 2019, the U.S. Institute for Peace released an important report on extremism in fragile states that developed recommendations focused on adopting a shared understanding, operationalize a prevention framework, and rallying the international community. 

Islamic extremism should not be equated with Islamic fundamentalism or Islamism, the former is defined as a movement of Muslims who believe that Muslim-majority countries should return to the fundamentals of an Islamic state and the latter movement is defined as a form of political Islam, but some experts consider both Islamic fundamentalism and Islamism to be forms of Islamic extremism. Acts of violence which are committed by Islamic terrorists and jihadists are frequently blamed on Islamic extremism, but Islamic extremism is not the root cause of every act of violence.

Definitions

Academic definition 
The academic definition of radical Islam consists of two parts:
 The first being: Islamic thought that states that all ideologies other than Islam, whether associated with the West (capitalism or democracy) or the East (communism or socialism) have failed and have demonstrated their bankruptcy.
 The second being: Islamic thought that states that (semi)secular regimes are wrong because of their negligence of Islam.

United Kingdom High Courts definition 
The UK High Courts have ruled in two cases on Islamic extremism, and provided definition.

Aside from those, two major definitions have been offered for Islamic extremism, sometimes using overlapping but also distinct aspects of extreme interpretations and pursuits of Islamic ideology:

 The use of violent tactics such as bombing and assassinations for achieving perceived Islamic goals (see Jihadism; or Zeyno Baran, Senior Fellow and Director of the Center for Eurasian Policy at the Hudson Institute, prefers the term Islamist extremism)
 An extremely conservative view of Islam, which does not necessarily entail violence (see also Islamic fundamentalism [Baran again prefers the term Islamism]).

UK High Court rulings 
There are two UK High Court cases that explicitly address the issue of Islamic extremism.

 May 2016: An Appeal from the Crown Court and Central Criminal Court: several individuals' cases considered together.
 October 2016:  In which the Judge concluded that Imam Shakeel Begg is an Islamic Extremist, and does not uphold Begg's claim that the BBC had libelled him by saying so.

May 2016 appeal case 
The judge refers to several grounds: section 20 of the 2006 Act; the definition of "terrorism" in section 1 of the Terrorism Act 2000 and the decision of the Supreme Court in R v Gul.

October 2016 Shakeel Begg case 
Begg, a prominent Muslim public figure and Imam at Lewisham Islamic Centre since 1998 lost his 2016 court case of Libel against the BBC. This case is noteworthy because the judge lists a 10-point definition of Islamic extremism that he used to determine the case:

In Charles Haddon-Cave's findings he wrote:

Extremist Islamic positions 
118. In my view, the following constitute "extremist" Islamic positions (or indicia thereof). 
 First, a 'Manichean' view of the world. A total, eternal 'Manichean' worldview is a central tenet of violent Islamic extremism.  It divides the world strictly into 'Us' versus 'Them': those who are blessed or saved (i.e. the "right kind" of Muslim) on the one hand and those who are to be damned for eternity (i.e. the "wrong kind" of Muslim and everyone else) on the other. For violent Islamic extremists, the "wrong kind" of Muslim includes moderate Sunni Muslims, all Shia Muslims, and many others who are "mete for the sword" and can be killed, and anyone who associates or collaborates" with them...
 Second, the reduction of jihad (striving in God's cause) to qital (armed combat) ('the Lesser Jihad')...
 Third, the ignoring or flouting of the conditions for the declaration of armed jihad (qital), i.e. the established Islamic doctrinal conditions for the declaration of armed combat (qital) set out above...
 Fourth, the ignoring or flouting of the strict regulations governing the conduct of armed jihad, i.e. the stipulations in the Qur'an and the Sunna for the ethics of conducting qital set out above. Thus, the use of excessive violence, attacks on civilians, indiscriminate 'suicide' violence and the torture or the murder of prisoners would constitute violation of these regulations of jihad...
 Fifth, advocating armed fighting in defence of Islam (qital) as a universal individual religious obligation (fard al 'ayn)...
 Sixth, any interpretation of Shari'a (i.e. religious law laid down by the Qur'an and the Sunna) that required breaking the 'law of the land'...
 Seventh, the classification of all non-Muslims as unbelievers (kuffar)...
 Eighth, the extreme Salafist Islamism doctrine that the precepts of the Muslim faith negate and supersede all other natural ties, such as those of family, kinship and nation...
 Ninth, the citing with approval the fatwa (legal opinions) of Islamic scholars who espouse extremist view...
 Tenth, any teaching which, expressly or implicitly, encourages Muslims to engage in, or support, terrorism or violence in the name of Allah.

Key influences of radical Islam

Early Islam 
According to the academic definition of radical Islam, the second condition for something to be called radical Islam, is that it is antigovernmental. Consequently, a government is a condition for radical Islam. However, even though the peace of Westphalia was established in 1648 and thus introduced the nation state, the writings of the formative centuries of Islamic history are influential to the contemporary writings that were coined radical after the concept of the nation state was established in the Muslim world as well. Key influences of radical Islam that stem from early Islam include:

Kharijites 

Islamic extremism dates back to the early history of Islam with the emergence of the Kharijites in the 7th century CE. The original schism between Kharijites, Sunnīs, and Shīʿas among Muslims was disputed over the political and religious succession to the guidance of the Muslim community (Ummah) after the death of the Islamic prophet Muhammad. From their essentially political position, the Kharijites developed extreme doctrines that set them apart from both mainstream Sunnī and Shīʿa Muslims. Shīʿas believe ʿAlī ibn Abī Ṭālib is the true successor to Muhammad, while Sunnīs consider Abu Bakr to hold that position. The Kharijites broke away from both the Shīʿas and the Sunnīs during the First Fitna (the first Islamic Civil War); they were particularly noted for adopting a radical approach to takfīr (excommunication), whereby they declared both Sunnī and Shīʿa Muslims to be either infidels (kuffār) or false Muslims (munāfiḳūn), and therefore deemed them worthy of death for their perceived apostasy (ridda).

The Islamic tradition traces the origin of the Kharijities to the battle between ʿAlī and Mu'awiya at Siffin in 657 CE. When ʿAlī was faced with a military stalemate and agreed to submit the dispute to arbitration, some of his party withdrew their support from him. "Judgement belongs to God alone" (لاَ حُكْكْ إلَا لِلّهِ) became the slogan of these secessionists. They also called themselves al-Shurat ("the Vendors"), to reflect their willingness to sell their lives in martyrdom.

These original Kharijites opposed both ʿAlī and Mu'awiya, and appointed their own leaders. They were decisively defeated by ʿAlī, who was in turn assassinated by a Kharijite. Kharijites engaged in guerilla warfare against the Umayyads, but only became a movement to be reckoned with during the Second Fitna (the second Islamic Civil War) when they at one point controlled more territory than any of their rivals. The Kharijites were, in fact, one of the major threats to Ibn al-Zubayr's bid for the caliphate; during this time they controlled Yamama and most of southern Arabia, and captured the oasis town of al-Ta'if.

The Azariqa, considered to be the extreme faction of the Kharijites, controlled parts of western Iran under the Umayyads until they were finally put down in 699 CE. The more moderate Ibadi Kharijites were longer-lived, continuing to wield political power in North and East Africa and in eastern Arabia during the 'Abbasid period. Because of their readiness to declare any opponent as apostate, the extreme Kharijites tended to fragment into small groups. One of the few points that the various Kharijite splinter groups held in common was their view of the caliphate, which differed from other Muslim theories on two points.

 First, they were principled egalitarians, holding that any pious Muslim ("even an Ethiopian slave") can become Caliph and that family or tribal affiliation is inconsequential. The only requirements for leadership are piety and acceptance by the community. 
 Second, they agreed that it is the duty of the believers to depose any leader who falls into error. This second principle had profound implications for Kharijite theology. Applying these ideas to the early history of the caliphate, Kharijites only accept Abu Bakr and 'Umar as legitimate caliphs. Of 'Uthman's caliphate they recognize only the first six years as legitimate, and they reject 'Ali altogether.

By the time that Ibn al-Muqaffa' wrote his political treatise early in the 'Abbasid period, the Kharijites were no longer a significant political threat, at least in the Islamic heartlands. The memory of the menace they had posed to Muslim unity and of the moral challenge generated by their pious idealism still weighed heavily on Muslim political and religious thought, however. Even if the Kharijites could no longer threaten, their ghosts still had to be answered. The Ibadis are the only Kharijite group to survive into modern times.

Ibn Taymiyyah

Modern Islam

Salafism and Wahhabism 

The Salafiyya movement is a conservative, Islahi (reform) movement within Sunnī Islam that emerged in the second half of the 19th century and advocate a return to the traditions of the "devout ancestors" (Salaf al-Salih). It has been described as the "fastest-growing Islamic movement"; with each scholar expressing diverse views across social, theological, and political spectrum. Salafis follow a doctrine that can be summed up as taking "a fundamentalist approach to Islam, emulating the Prophet Muhammad and his earliest followers—al-salaf al-salih, the 'pious forefathers'....They reject religious innovation, or bidʻah, and support the implementation of Sharia (Islamic law)." The Salafi movement is often divided into three categories: the largest group are the purists (or quietists), who avoid politics; the second largest group are the militant activists, who get involved in politics; the third and last group are the jihadists, who constitute a minority. Most of the violent Islamist groups come from the Salafi-Jihadist movement and their subgroups. In recent years, Jihadi-Salafist doctrines have often been associated with the armed insurgencies of Islamic extremist movements and terrorist organizations targeting innocent civilians, both Muslims and Non-Muslims, such as al-Qaeda, ISIL/ISIS/IS/Daesh, Boko Haram, etc. The second largest group are the Salafi activists who have a long tradition of political activism, such as those that operate in organizations like the Muslim Brotherhood, the Arab world's major Islamist movement. In the aftermath of widescale repressions after the Arab spring, accompanied by their political failures, the activist-Salafi movements have undergone a decline. The most numerous are the quietists, who believe in disengagement from politics and accept allegiance to Muslim governments, no matter how tyrannical, to avoid fitna (chaos).

The Wahhabi movement was founded and spearheaded by the Ḥanbalī scholar and theologian Muhammad ibn ʿAbd al-Wahhab, a religious preacher from the Najd region in central Arabia, and was instrumental in the rise of the House of Saud to power in the Arabian peninsula. Ibn ʿAbd al-Wahhab sought to revive and purify Islam from what he perceived as non-Islamic popular religious beliefs and practices by returning to what, he believed, were the fundamental principles of the Islamic religion. His works were generally short, full of quotations from the Quran and Hadith literature, such as his main and foremost theological treatise, Kitāb at-Tawḥīd ("The Book of Oneness"). He taught that the primary doctrine of Islam was the uniqueness and oneness of God (tawḥīd), and denounced what he held to be popular religious beliefs and practices among Muslims that he considered to be akin to heretical innovation (bidʿah) and polytheism (shirk).

Wahhabism has been described as a conservative, strict, and fundamentalist branch of Sunnī Islam, with puritan views, believing in a literal interpretation of the Quran. The terms "Wahhabism" and "Salafism" are sometimes evoked interchangeably, although the designation "Wahhabi" is specifically applied to the followers of Muhammad ibn ʿAbd al-Wahhab and his reformist doctrines. The label "Wahhabi" was not claimed by his followers, who usually refer themselves as al-Muwaḥḥidūn ("affirmers of the singularity of God"), but is rather employed by Western scholars as well as his critics. Starting in the mid-1970s and 1980s, the international propagation of Salafism and Wahhabism within Sunnī Islam favored by the Kingdom of Saudi Arabia and other Arab states of the Persian Gulf has achieved what the French political scientist Gilles Kepel defined as a "preeminent position of strength in the global expression of Islam."

22 months after the September 11 attacks, when the FBI considered al-Qaeda as "the number one terrorist threat to the United States", journalist Stephen Schwartz and U.S. Senator Jon Kyl have explicitly stated during a hearing that occurred in June 2003 before the Subcommittee on Terrorism, Technology, and Homeland Security of the U.S. Senate that "Wahhabism is the source of the overwhelming majority of terrorist atrocities in today's world". As part of the global "War on Terror", Wahhabism has been accused by the European Parliament, various Western security analysts, and think tanks like the RAND Corporation, as being "a source of global terrorism". Furthermore, Wahhabism has been accused of causing disunity in the Muslim community (Ummah) and criticized for its followers' destruction of many Islamic, cultural, and historical sites associated with the early history of Islam and the first generation of Muslims (Muhammad's family and his companions) in Saudi Arabia.

Contemporary Islam 

The contemporary period begins after 1924. With the defeat and dissolution of the Ottoman Empire (1908–1922), the Ottoman Caliphate was also abolished. This event heavily influenced Islamic thinking in general, but also what would later be coined radical Islamic thought. Key thinkers that wrote about Islam in the 20th century, and especially about jihad, include:

Muhammad Abduh

Rashid Rida

Hassan al-Banna

Abul A'la al-Maududi

Sayyid Qutb

Sayyid Qutb, an Egyptian Islamist ideologue and prominent figurehead of the Muslim Brotherhood in Egypt, was influential in promoting the Pan-Islamist ideology in the 1960s. When he was executed by the Egyptian government under the regime of Gamal Abdel Nasser, Ayman al-Zawahiri formed the organization Egyptian Islamic Jihad to replace the government with an Islamic state that would reflect Qutb's ideas for the Islamic revival that he yearned for. The Qutbist ideology has been influential on jihadist movements and Islamic terrorists that seek to overthrow secular governments, most notably Osama bin Laden and Ayman al-Zawahiri of al-Qaeda, as well as the Salafi-jihadi terrorist group ISIL/ISIS/IS/Daesh. Moreover, Qutb's books have been frequently been cited by Osama bin Laden and Anwar al-Awlaki.

Sayyid Qutb could be said to have founded the actual movement of radical Islam. Unlike the other Islamic thinkers that have been mentioned above, Qutb was not an apologist. He was a prominent leader of the Muslim Brotherhood and a highly influential Islamist ideologue, and the first to articulate these anathemizing principles in his magnum opus Fī ẓilāl al-Qurʾān (In the shade of the Qurʾān) and his 1966 manifesto Maʿālim fīl-ṭarīq (Milestones), which lead to his execution by the Egyptian government. Other Salafi movements in the Middle East and North Africa and across the Muslim world adopted many of his Islamist principles.

According to Qutb, the Muslim community (Ummah) has been extinct for several centuries and reverted to jahiliyah (the pre-Islamic age of ignorance) because those who call themselves Muslims have failed to follow the sharia law. In order to restore Islam, bring back its days of glory, and free the Muslims from the clasps of ignorance, Qutb proposed the shunning of modern society, establishing a vanguard modeled after the early Muslims, preaching, and bracing oneself for poverty or even death as preparation for jihad against what he perceived as jahili government/society, and overthrow them. Qutbism, the radical Islamist ideology derived from the ideas of Qutb, was denounced by many prominent Muslim scholars as well as other members of the Muslim Brotherhood, like Yusuf al-Qaradawi.



Groups

Foreign Political support
According to the British historian  Mark Curtis, in his book Secret Affairs: Britain's Collusion with Radical Islam, Britain has been accused of consistently supporting radical Islam to combat secular nationalism. Because the secular nationalists threatened to seize the resources of their countries and use it for internal development, which was not accepted by England.
The United States, like Britain before it, has been accused of historically supporting radical Islam in the face of secular nationalism, seen as a major threat to Western colonial dominance. Chomsky and coauthors accuse Israel of destroying Egypt and Syria in 1967, two bastions of secular Arab nationalism opposed to Saudi Arabia, which they view as the leader of radical Islam.

See also 

 Antisemitism in Islam
 Attacks by Islamic extremists in Bangladesh
 Islam and other religions
 Islam and secularism
 Islam and violence
 Islam and war
 Holy war in Islam
 Islam Yes, Islamic Party No
 Islamic extremism in Mali
 Islamic extremism in Northern Nigeria
 Islamic extremism in the 20th-century Egypt
 Islamic terrorism
 Jihadism
 Jihadist extremism in the United States
 Islamism
 Post-Islamism
 List of Islamist terrorist attacks
 List of thwarted Islamist terrorist attacks
 Mujahideen
 Petro-Islam
 Qutbism
 Religious fanaticism in Islam
 Salafi movement
 International propagation of Salafism and Wahhabism (by region)
 Salafi jihadism
 Wahhabism
 Takfirism
 Violent extremism

Further reading

References

External links 
 

Religious extremism
 
Islam and politics
Islam-related controversies
Islamic practices
Islamism
Political ideologies
Islamic fundamentalism